Franciscan University may refer to:
Franciscan University of Steubenville
Universidade Franciscana
University of Arizona Global Campus
Universidad Francisco Marroquín
Francisco de Vitoria University
Francisco de Paula Santander University
Universidad Federico Henríquez y Carvajal
Francisco Gavidia University

See also
Franciscan University murders